Tres Olivos is a station on Line 10 of the Madrid Metro. It is located in fare Zone A.

As the interchange station from Line 10A to 10B (MetroNorte) toward Hospital Infanta Sofía, it has two platforms.

References 

Line 10 (Madrid Metro) stations
Railway stations in Spain opened in 2007
Buildings and structures in Fuencarral-El Pardo District, Madrid